PM Press is an independent publisher, founded in 2007, that specializes in radical, Marxist and anarchist literature, as well as crime fiction, graphic novels, music CDs, and political documentaries.  It has offices in the San Francisco Bay Area, Los Angeles, and West Virginia.

History

PM Press was started in late 2007 by AK Press founder Ramsey Kanaan and several other members of AK Press, including Craig O'Hara.

In their first year, they published Wobblies & Zapatistas, a synthesis of anarchism and Marxism by historian Staughton Lynd and Balkans dissident Andrej Grubacic; Chumbawamba’s four-part harmonizing of the history of British dissent in English Rebel Songs 1381–1984; The Big Noise production team's video magazine Dispatches; Lois Ahrens’ graphic depiction of the effects of mass incarceration in The Real Cost of Prisons Comix; Teaching Rebellion, the oral histories of the Oaxacan Uprising (also available in a Spanish-language edition); eco-philosopher Derrick Jensen (How Shall I Live My Life? and Now This War Has Two Sides CD), and former Black Panther and freed member of the Angola 3 Robert King (From the Bottom of the Heap: The Autobiography of Black Panther Robert Hillary King); the activism of Staughton Lynd and IWW Starbucks organizer Daniel Gross in Labor Law for the Rank and Filer, and the last three decades of struggle to free political prisoners, Let Freedom Ring.

In 2009, PM releases included a documentary history of the Red Army Faction, a documentary on the 1970s British anarchist urban guerrillas The Angry Brigade, a history of the struggles of incarcerated women in the United States written by Victoria Law, and My Baby Rides the Short Bus, an anthology of personal essays and stories about raising children with disabilities.

2010 saw an edition of Peter Marshall’s history of anarchism, Demanding the Impossible, a radical new examination of the politics of pirates by Gabriel Kuhn, the first English-language edition of writings by German agitator and theorist Gustav Landauer, and Tunnel People by photojournalist Teun Voeten, as well as From Here to There: The Staughton Lynd Reader and anthologies of works by Paul Goodman.

PM has also launched a noir imprint, Switchblade; a "Spectacular Fiction" imprint for science fiction; "Found in Translation", featuring translations of fiction by Japanese author Tomoyuki Hoshino, and Calling All Heroes by Mexican novelist Paco Ignacio Taibo II; "Spectre", a political economy imprint, and "Tofuhound", an imprint founded by Vegan Freak authors Bob and Jenna Torres. The "Outspoken Authors" imprint of pocketbooks feature fiction writers with conversations on their work, politics, writing, and engagement—science fiction Terry Bisson, Michael Moorcock, Kim Stanley Robinson and Eleanor Arnason were among the authors featured; crime writer Gary Phillips was the only non-SF author to have an Outspoken Authors title.

PM also published previously unpublished work on politics from Trinidadian revolutionary thinker C. L. R. James, works by the London stencil artist Banksy, healthy cooking from Bitch Magazine founder Lisa Jervis; Arena, a journal of anarchist arts and culture edited by Stuart Christie; and a new imprint with DC's Busboys & Poets.

In 2020, the publisher sold ebooks to Internet Archive in a way to make them available to the public.
Brewster Kahle later testified that "They're a great press".

In 2022, PM Press relocated from California to New York.

See also 

 :Category:PM Press books

References

External links
Official website

2007 establishments in California

American companies established in 2007
Anarchist publishing companies
Book publishing companies based in the San Francisco Bay Area
Book publishing companies of the United States
Companies based in Oakland, California
Mass media in California
Political book publishing companies
Publishing companies established in 2007